China is an unincorporated community in southern Howell County, in the U.S. state of Missouri. The China Union Church sits adjacent to Route JJ at the location.

History
A post office called China was established in 1892, and remained in operation until 1897. The community took its name from a local church of the same name.

References

Unincorporated communities in Howell County, Missouri
Unincorporated communities in Missouri